The Moonstone is a 1959 British television serial adapted from the 1868 Wilkie Collins novel The Moonstone. The series was made by the BBC and ran in 1959 over seven episodes.

Cast and characters

References

External links
 

1950s British television miniseries
Films based on works by Wilkie Collins
1959 British television series debuts
1959 British television series endings